Sekolah Menengah Kebangsaan Pusat Bandar Puchong (1) or SMKPBP1 is a secondary school located in Pusat Bandar Puchong, Selangor, Malaysia. This school started since 2003. As of 2014, the total number of students is around 2900, including morning and afternoon classes.

Buildings
 Block A1
 Block A2 
 Block B
 Block C
 Block D
 Block E
 Surau
 Canteen
 Guard house
 3 class cabins at the field

Non-building facilities and/or feature
 Field
 Gardens
 Assembly area

In-Building facilities
 Library
 School Hall
 Main Office
 Teacher's Office
 Discipline Room
 Science Labs
 Workshop
 Restrooms
 CCTV
 Locker
 Computer Labs
 Koperasi

2009 - 2023
 PMR 2008 results
More than 60 students scored straight A's.
 Program Jalinan Kasih CNY (21 Jan 09)
A celebration was held at around 3.45pm until 6pm, with the presence of YB Dato' Dr. Wee Ka Siong, Deputy Minister of Education.
gifts were given to the needed students in the school.
 Road Run 2009
Our yearly event. Took place on the 21st of February this year. Students of all forms participated in this event, either by helping or by running itself. The route is divided into two, one for the boys and one for the girls, the boys were made to run a longer distance compared to the girls. At the end of the run, top ten runners for each category were given prizes. This is the most anticipated even of the year in preparation for our Sports day not long afterwards. Marks were given to the specific sport house(rumah sukan) of green, yellow, blue or red.
 6th annual Sports Day 2009
Held on 2 March. The day where all the hard work pays off. Marks from Road Run are added to the sport houses together with the events that took place on this day. Students could show off their running talent or just to show support for their sport houses were present. Parents too came to show some support. Green won Best March Troop, while Red won the overall.
Gaza Found
Every school in Malaysia was involved in this fund collection, SMK PBP(1) was not left out. The purpose of this was to collect some money for the people in Gaza who needed help.

Recognition '09
 School - 1st Place - Anugerah Kualiti Kategoti Pusat Sumber Sekolah
 Football - Champion MSS Puchong Serdang Zone, Champion MSSD Petaling Perdana
 Basketball - Champion MSSD Petaling Perdana
 Long Jump - Champion (Broken MSSD record) MSSD
 English Speech - 1st Place Puchong/Serdang Zone
 Bahasa Melayu Speech (Pencagah Rasual PraUniversiti) - 1st Place Petaling Perdana District
 Geography Quiz - 1st Place Petaling Perdana District
 Young Enterprise Competition - Best Teamwork - Optimax Ent. (YE 2009)
 Rugby (2016) - 3rd Place in Selangor Zone

Incident
On Monday, lawyer Mohd Khairul Azam Abdul Aziz, who is also vice-president of the fledgling Putra, threatened to file a police report against SMK Pusat Bandar Puchong (1) in Pusat Bandar Puchong for its “religious” Chinese New Year decoration. The lawyer claimed the decoration to be “unconstitutional”. He further claimed that Muslim parents had complained about the decoration, which they see as an attempt to propagate a non-Islam religion to students. Khairul later claimed the school principal, Rohani Mohd Noor, promised in an email reply to take down all the Chinese New Year decorations. Lately, former Deputy Minister of Education Teo Nie Ching had put back the CNY decoration along with Wan Azizah Wan Ismail and other Pakatan Harapan leaders.

References

Secondary schools in Malaysia
Educational institutions established in 2003
2003 establishments in Malaysia